is a passenger railway station located in the city of Tamano, Okayama Prefecture, Japan, operated by the West Japan Railway Company (JR West). The station was formerly the start of a Japan National Railways ferry that went over the Seto Inland Sea to Takamatsu Station before the Great Seto Bridge was built.

Lines

Station layout
The station consists of two ground-level dead-headed island platforms, one of which is not in  operation. The station is staffed.

Platforms

Adjacent stations

History
Uno Station was opened on 12 June 1910.  With the privatization of Japanese National Railways (JNR) on 1 April 1987, the station came under the control of JR West.

Passenger statistics
In fiscal 2019, the station was used by an average of 1309 passengers daily

Surrounding area
Tamano City Tourist Information Center
Tamano Chamber of Commerce and Industry
Tamano City Hall

See also
List of railway stations in Japan

References

External links

 JR West Station Official Site

Railway stations in Okayama Prefecture
Uno Line
Railway stations in Japan opened in 1910
Tamano, Okayama